Bukowina may refer to the geographical region of Bukovina, now divided between Romania and Ukraine and known in German and Polish as Bukowina.

Bukowina may also refer to any of the following places in Poland:

 Bukowina, Lower Silesian Voivodeship
 Bukowina, Biłgoraj County in Lublin Voivodeship
 Bukowina, Piotrków County in Łódź Voivodeship
 Bukowina, Sieradz County in Łódź Voivodeship
 Bukowina, Lesser Poland Voivodeship
 Bukowina, Tomaszów Lubelski County in Lublin Voivodeship
 Bukowina, Jarosław County in Subcarpathian Voivodeship
 Bukowina, Nisko County in Subcarpathian Voivodeship
 Bukowina, Lubusz Voivodeship
 Bukowina, Pomeranian Voivodeship

See also 
 Bukovina (disambiguation)